The Passacaglia for orchestra, Opus 1, from 1908, is the first published composition of twentieth century Austrian composer Anton Webern. It is based on the 17th century musical form, the passacaglia.

Ordinarily a dance in triple meter, Webern's Passacaglia is neither a dance nor in triple meter.  Structurally, it is based on an eight-note phrase forming a bass line, with twenty-three variations grouped into three sections.

In contrast to Webern's later work, this piece is in a late Romantic style.  It has echoes of Brahms' Symphony No. 4.

References

External links

Compositions by Anton Webern
1908 compositions